The following lists events that happened during 2008 in the Grand Duchy of Luxembourg.

Incumbents

Events

January – March
 24 January – The section of the A7 motorway between Lorentzweiler and Schoenfels opens.
 1 April – A new terminal, the General Aviation Terminal, is opened at Luxembourg – Findel Airport by Lucien Lux.
 15 February – Roger Molitor is appointed to the Council of State, replacing Pierre Mores, who resigned the previous September.
 20 February – The Chamber of Deputies votes 30–26 in favour of the first reading of a bill legalising voluntary euthanasia in certain circumstances.

April – June
 25 April – A new terminal, Terminal A, is opened at Luxembourg – Findel Airport by Grand Duke Henri.
 20 May – The 2007-08 season of the  National Division finishes, with F91 Dudelange winning the title for a fourth successive season.
 22 May – Jean-Claude Juncker delivers his fourteenth State of the Nation address.
 24 May – CS Grevenmacher win the Luxembourg Cup, beating FC Victoria Rosport 4–1 in the final, having relegated Rosport from the National Division the previous week.
 8 June – The Netherlands' Joost Posthuma wins the 2008 Tour de Luxembourg.
 17 June – Luxembourg, Belgium, and the Netherlands sign a new Benelux treaty.

July – September
 29 August – Office rental group Regus announces that it would move its headquarters from the United Kingdom to Luxembourg.
 10 September – Luxembourg's national football team defeats Switzerland 2–1 to record their first competitive victory since 1995.
 28 September – The governments of Luxembourg, Belgium, and the Netherlands agree to part-nationalise Fortis and recapitalise the bank with public money.  Luxembourg's government injects €2.5bn, and receives 49% of Fortis's Luxembourg operations in return.
 30 September – Dexia is part-nationalised by the governments of France, Belgium, and Luxembourg.  Luxembourg loans Dexia €400m.

October – December
 6 October – The new 'Judiciary City' in Luxembourg City is officially inaugurated.
 3 November – The National Literature Awards are held, with Carine Krecké winning first prize.
 19 November – The national football team draws 1–1 with Belgium, three days before the Luxembourg Football Federation's hundredth anniversary.
 2 December – Grand Duke Henri unexpectedly announces that he will not sign the pending euthanasia bill if it is passed by the Chamber of Deputies, creating a constitutional crisis.
 9 December – Cyclist Fränk Schleck is cleared of doping charges.
 11 December – The Chamber of Deputies votes 56 votes to none, with one abstention, to strip the Grand Duke of his right to withhold assent from legislation.
 12 December – A Belgian court rules that the division of Fortis between the three Benelux governments cannot proceed.

Deaths
 29 January – Marcelle Lentz-Cornette, politician

Footnotes

 
Years of the 21st century in Luxembourg
Luxembourg
2000s in Luxembourg
Luxembourg